A buttonhole is a hole in a fabric that is paired with a functional button that serves as a fastener.

Buttonhole may also refer to:

 Buttonhole (floral), a flower or floral decoration worn by men
 Buttonhole (knitting), a buttonhole in a knitted fabric

See also
 Buttonholer